Hirendranath Mukhopadhyay (23 November 1907 – 30 July 2004), also known as Hiren Mukerjee, was an Indian politician, lawyer and academic. He was a member of the Communist Party of India having joined in 1936 when it was still illegal. He was elected to the Lok Sabha the lower house of the Indian Parliament from the Calcutta North East constituency in 1951, 1957, 1962, 1967 and 1971. He suffered an electoral reverse when he lost to Pratap Chandra Chunder in 1977  after the CPI supported Emergency.

He was awarded the second highest civilian honour Padma Vibhushan by Government of India in 1991, earlier he was awarded the Padma Bhushan in 1990.
He was a profound and passionate orator in English and Bengali, and his natural eloquence was marked by a surpassing erudition and encyclopaedic memory. His speeches were also marked by a full-throated delivery, an impeccable Oxonian pronunciation in English and his Calcutta idiom and intonation in Bengali. He was one of the most remarkable parliamentary speakers in India for all time.

Early life and education
Born in Calcutta (now Kolkata) to Sachindra Nath Mukerjee, he studied at Taltala High School and received B.A. and M.A. degrees in History from Presidency College, Calcutta, then affiliated with the University of Calcutta. Thereafter he completed his higher education with B. Litt. (Oxon) from St Catherine's College, Oxford and Barrister-at-Law (Comm.) from Lincoln's Inn, London.

Career
Hiren Mukerjee started his career as an educator, eventually serving as a senior lecturer in History and Politics, Andhra University, 1934–35, lecturer in History and Political Philosophy, Calcutta University, 1940—44, and remained the Head of the Department of History, Surendranath College, Calcutta from 1936 to 1962. 
He joined the Communist Party of India in 1936. Conversion to communism came somewhat earlier, while studying at Oxford and training to be a Barrister at Law in the United Kingdom.
He was Member, All India Congress Committee (A.I.C.C.), 1938–39; Member of Executive Committee, Bengal Provincial Congress Committee, 1938–39; Joint Secretary, Bengal Committee, Congress Socialist Party, 1938; President, Bengal Provincial Students' Conference, 1936; Founder Member, All India Progressive Writers' Association, 1936; President, All India Students' Conference, Nagpur, 1940; Editor "Indo-Soviet Journal", Calcutta, 1941–45; Chairman, Indian Peoples' Theatre Association (IPTA) Conference, Bombay, 1943; Founder Member, Friends of Soviet Union, and Joint Secretary, 1944–52; Joint Editor, "Calcutta Weekly Notes" (Law Journal), 1945–52; Member, Bengal Committee, Communist Party of India, 1947–49; President, Bengal Motion Pictures Employees' Union since 1946; Vice-President, Bengal Provincial Trade Union Congress, 1948–49. 
Suffered imprisonment without trial twice – in 1948 and 1949.

He won five consecutive elections from the Calcutta North East constituency in 1952, 1957, 1962, 1967 and 1971. He was elected to the first elected Parliament of independent India (1952–57) from a Calcutta constituency which returned him five times repeatedly till 1977 (Member, First Lok Sabha, 1952–57; Second Lok Sabha 1957–62; Third Lok Sabha, 1962–67; Fourth Lok Sabha, 1967–70 and Fifth Lok Sabha, 1971–77).

He was the leader of CPI group, 1964 – 67. Deputy Leader, 1952 – 64, 1967 – 71. Member, Public Accounts Committee, 1969–70 and 1973–74; Chairman, Public Accounts Committee, 1975–76 and 1976–77; Member, Indian Delegation to the Commonwealth Parliamentary Conference (1959) in Australia, Inter-Parliamentary Union Conference (1972) in Italy, Yaounde, Cameroon (W. Africa), April 1972, and Rome, September 1972.

He was also the honorary Adviser, Parliament Library and Bureau of Parliamentary Studies and Training, 1978–82; and Honorary Advisor to the Speaker of Lok Sabha, 1978–82.

He was invited to International Teach-In by Toronto University, Canada (1966); invited to lecture at German Academy, Berlin, 1967; invited to take part in International Symposium on Lenin at Alma Ata, Kazakhstan, USSR in 1969; invited to deliver lectures at many universities in India and overseas.

In spite of political preoccupation, he was known as an eminent academic. He received honorary degree of D.Litt. from Andhra University, Calcutta University, Kalyani University, North Bengal University and Rabindra Bharati University. He was awarded Soviet Land Nehru Prize in 1978; and was the recipient of Vidyasagar Award (1992) and Nazrul Award (2000) from the Government of West Bengal and Advaita Mallavarmana Award from the Government of Tripura (2002), Maulana Azad Award by the Muslim Cultural Association and Muzaffar Ahmed Smriti Puraskar.

He was awarded Padma Bhushan in 1990 and Padma Vibhushan in 1991 by the President of India for his lifelong services.

He was a writer of numerous articles in both English and Bengali over seven decades; author of nearly 50 published books.

Hiren Mukerjee was a writer in two languages, English and Bengali, and commanded a distinctive and inimitable style in both. Despite the profundity of style and content he could introduce a charming lightheartedness and exuberance, his vocabulary ranging from the classical to the colloquial, and his references being wide, eclectic and polymathic. He was also an active epistoler, and replied to every correspondent, always writing in his own hand till his last days. Less known perhaps was his amazing command of Sanskrit, from which he quoted aptly and abundantly in his speeches and writings if the occasion demanded, his phenomenal memory coming to his aid. 
Some of his published books are – An Introduction to Socialism, Under Marx's Banner, Marx, Great October, India and the Future, Credo: Some Socialist Affirmations, India and Parliament, India's Struggle for Freedom, Studies of Rabindranath Tagore, Gandhiji, Jawaharlal Nehru, Subhas Chandra Bose and Swami Vivekananda. Voluminous writings in Bengali include an impressive and significant book of reminiscences, Tari Hote Teer ("From the Boat to the Shore") and collection of selected articles in two volumes.

Notwithstanding his shining qualities and often fiery eloquence, in personal demeanour Hiren Mukerjee was  a quiet and unassuming personality, even to the point of shyness. He died in Kolkata on 30 July 2004 at the age of 96.       
Hailed as the Communist Rishi (ref. Sri Gopal Gandhi's obituary in The Hindu dated 1 August 2004), Hirendra Nath Mukerjee left lasting impression on our national life. Appropriately, the Parliament of India instituted the "Professor Hiren Mukerjee Memorial Parliamentary Lecture" from 2008 (Hiren Mukerjee's birth centenary year). The lecture was the first of its kind in the history of Indian Parliament and indeed a tribute to one of the greatest parliamentarians India has produced. Held in the Central Hall of Parliament, the first four Memorial Lectures were delivered by Nobel-Laureate Professor Amartya Sen (2008), Nobel Laureate economist/banker Md Yunus (2009), eminent economist Prof. Jagdish Bhagwati (2010) and the Prime Minister of Bhutan,  H. E. Lyonchen Jigmi Y. Thinley (2012). The Lok Sabha Secretariat also produced a  publication entitled "Hiren Mukerjee in Parliament" compiling some of his important speeches in the Lok Sabha spanning 25 years.

References

External links
 Official biographical sketch in Parliament of India website

1907 births
2004 deaths
India MPs 1952–1957
India MPs 1957–1962
India MPs 1962–1967
India MPs 1967–1970
India MPs 1971–1977
Communist Party of India politicians from West Bengal
Presidency University, Kolkata alumni
University of Calcutta alumni
Alumni of St Catherine's College, Oxford
Members of Lincoln's Inn
Academic staff of the University of Calcutta
Academic staff of Andhra University
Recipients of the Padma Bhushan in literature & education
Recipients of the Padma Vibhushan in public affairs
Lok Sabha members from West Bengal
Politicians from Kolkata